Colsyrnola is a small genus of minute sea snails within the subfamily Syrnolinae (Pyramidellidae).

Species
, the World Register of Marine Species accepts seven species within the genus Colsyrnola:

 Colsyrnola brunnea 
 Colsyrnola decolorata 
 Colsyrnola margarita 
 Colsyrnola ornata 
 Colsyrnola semiaurea 
 Colsyrnola sericea 
 Colsyrnola translucida

References

Pyramidellidae